Eric Murray (born January 7, 1994) is an American football strong safety for the Houston Texans of the National Football League (NFL). He played college football at Minnesota, and was selected by the Kansas City Chiefs in the fourth round of the 2016 NFL Draft. He has also played for the Cleveland Browns.

Professional career

Kansas City Chiefs

2016
The Kansas City Chiefs selected Murray in the fourth round (106th overall) of the 2016 NFL Draft. He was the 17th cornerback drafted and the second cornerback selected by the Chiefs after third round pick KeiVarae Russell.

On May 17, 2016, the Chiefs signed Murray to a four-year, $2.96 million contract that includes a signing bonus of $599,803.

Entering organized team activities, Murray was expected to compete for a job as the starting cornerback against Steven Nelson, Marcus Cooper, Phillip Gaines, KeiVarae Russell, and D. J. White after it was left vacant by the departure of Sean Smith to the Oakland Raiders in free agency. During rookie minicamp, defensive coordinator Bob Sutton decided to try Murray at safety and opted to keep him at safety due to the retirement of Husain Abdullah, departure of Tyvon Branch in free agency, and an injury to Eric Berry. Throughout training camp, he competed for the job at safety against Jamell Fleming, Stevie Brown, Daniel Sorensen, Ron Parker, Akeem Davis, and Shakiel Randolph. Head coach Andy Reid named Murray the backup free safety behind Ron Parker to start the regular season.

He made his professional regular season debut in the Kansas City Chiefs' season-opener against the San Diego Chargers and recorded his first career tackle during a 33–27 overtime victory. On December 25, 2016, Murray made a season-high two solo tackles in the Chiefs' 33–10 victory against the Denver Broncos. He finished his rookie season with eight solo tackles and a fumble recovery in 16 games and zero starts. Throughout the season, he was limited mostly to special teams and had only 67 snaps on defense. He tied with Daniel Sorensen for the team lead with 367 special teams snaps that accounted for 82% of them.

The Kansas City Chiefs finished first in the AFC West with a 12–4 record, clinching a first round bye and home field advantage. On January 15, 2017, Murray appeared in his first career playoff game and made one tackle during their 18–16 loss to the Pittsburgh Steelers in the AFC Divisional Round.

2017
During OTA's and training camp, Murray competed for a job as a backup safety against Daniel Sorensen, Leon McQuay III, Marqueston Huff, and Jordan Stern. Defensive coordinator Bob Sutton named him the backup free safety, behind Ron Parker, to start the regular season.

Starting strong safety Eric Berry tore his Achilles tendon in the Chiefs' season-opening 42–27 victory at the New England Patriots and was expected to miss the rest of the season. Murray was elevated to the Chiefs' premier backup safety role, participating in nickel and dime packages. On September 17, 2017, Murray recorded a season-high six solo tackles and two pass deflections in a 27–20 victory against the Philadelphia Eagles. In Week 5, he earned his first career start and recorded two combined tackles during a 42–24 victory at the Houston Texans. On November 26, 2017, Murray made one tackle before leaving the Chiefs' 16-10 loss to the Buffalo Bills in the second quarter after sustaining an injury. He missed the next two games (Weeks 13–14) due to a high-ankle sprain and had Darrelle Revis fill in during his absence. In Week 15, Murray made three solo tackles and his first career sack on quarterback Philip Rivers in the Chiefs' 30–23 victory against the Los Angeles Chargers. On December 31, 2017, he earned his second career start after the Chiefs clinched a playoff berth and head coach Andy Reid opted to rest Daniel Sorensen and Ron Parker. Murray made two solo tackles in their 27–24 victory at the Denver Broncos. He finished the  season with 36 combined tackles (31 solo), five pass deflections, and a sack in 14 games and two starts.

The Chiefs received a playoff berth, but lost to the Tennessee Titans 22–21 in the AFC Wildcard Game. Murray made one tackle during their loss.

Cleveland Browns
Murray was traded to the Cleveland Browns on April 1, 2019 in exchange for Emmanuel Ogbah.

Houston Texans
On April 1, 2020, Murray signed a three-year, $20.25 million contract with the Houston Texans.

In Week 14 against the Chicago Bears, Murray led the team with 11 tackles and sacked Mitchell Trubisky twice during the 36–7 loss. Murray was placed on the reserve/COVID-19 list by the Texans on December 27, 2020, and activated on January 13, 2021.

On March 16, 2022, Murray signed a two-year, $10 million contract extension with the Texans.

NFL career statistics

References

External links
 Houston Texans bio
 Minnesota Golden Gophers bio

1994 births
Living people
Players of American football from Milwaukee
American football cornerbacks
Minnesota Golden Gophers football players
Kansas City Chiefs players
Cleveland Browns players
Houston Texans players